Tumor suppressor p53-binding protein 1 also known as p53-binding protein 1 or 53BP1 is a protein that in humans is encoded by the TP53BP1 gene.

Clinical significance 

53BP1 is underexpressed in most cases of triple-negative breast cancer.

DNA repair

DNA double-strand breaks (DSBs) are cytotoxic damages that can be repaired either by the homologous recombinational repair (HR) pathway or by the non-homologous end-joining (NHEJ) pathway. NHEJ, although faster than HR, is less accurate.  The early divergent step between the two pathways is end resection, and this step is regulated by numerous factors.  In particular, BRCA1 and 53BP1 play a role in determining the balance between the two pathways.  53BP1 restricts resection and promotes NHEJ.

Age-associated deficient repair

Ordinarily during the G1 phase of the cell cycle, when a sister chromatid is unavailable for HR, NHEJ is the predominant pathway for repairing DNA double-strand breaks (DSBs).  However, as individuals age, recruitment of 53BP1 to DSBs during G1 becomes deficient.  The absence of 53BP1 at such DSBs appears to promote the alternative error-prone repair process Alt-EJ.  This repair process, also referred to as microhomology-mediated end joining, is highly inaccurate and likely contributes to the aging process.

Interactions 

53BP1 has been shown to physically interact with:

 Histone H4 dimethylated or monomethylated at Lysine 20
 Histone H2A or Histone H2A.X ubiquitinated at Lysine 15
 p53
 DYNLL1

References

Further reading

External links